On the Reeperbahn at Half Past Midnight is a 1929 German silent adventure film directed by Fred Stranz and starring Eddie Polo, Lydia Potechina, and Harry Nestor. The film takes its name from the 1912 song of the same name, which refers to the Reeperbahn in Hamburg. It was shot at the Johannisthal Studios in Berlin. The film's sets were designed by the art director Otto Moldenhauer. It was made by the German subsidiary of the Hollywood studio Universal Pictures.

Cast

References

Bibliography

External links

1929 films
1929 crime films
German crime films
Films of the Weimar Republic
German silent feature films
Films set in Hamburg
Films about pigs
German black-and-white films
Universal Pictures films
German adventure films
1929 adventure films
Silent adventure films
1920s German films
Films shot at Johannisthal Studios
1920s German-language films